The All-Party Group for World Governance, previously the All-Party Group for World Government, founded by Henry Usborne in 1947, is one of the oldest groups in the British Parliament. At its peak, it had over 200 members from the House of Commons and the House of Lords. The Group founded the One World Trust in 1951.

References
A Shared History: The All-Party Group for World Government and the One World Trust.

World Government
1947 establishments in the United Kingdom
Organizations established in 1947